is the second tallest mountain in the Teshio Mountains. It is located in Horokanai, Hokkaido, Japan.

References
Geographical Survey Institute

Mountains of Hokkaido